In algebra, the Vandermonde polynomial of an ordered set of n variables , named after Alexandre-Théophile Vandermonde, is the polynomial:

(Some sources use the opposite order , which changes the sign  times: thus in some dimensions the two formulas agree in sign, while in others they have opposite signs.)

It is also called the Vandermonde determinant, as it is the determinant of the Vandermonde matrix.

The value depends on the order of the terms: it is an alternating polynomial, not a symmetric polynomial.

Alternating 

It thus depends on the order, and is zero if two entries are equal – this also follows from the formula, but is also consequence of being alternating: if two variables are equal, then switching them both does not change the value and inverts the value, yielding  and thus  (assuming the characteristic is not 2, otherwise being alternating is equivalent to being symmetric).

Conversely, the Vandermonde polynomial is a factor of every alternating polynomial: as shown above, an alternating polynomial vanishes if any two variables are equal, and thus must have  as a factor for all .

Alternating polynomials 

Thus, the Vandermonde polynomial (together with the symmetric polynomials) generates the alternating polynomials.

Discriminant 
Its square is widely called the discriminant, though some sources call the Vandermonde polynomial itself the discriminant.

If one adjoins the Vandermonde polynomial to the ring of symmetric polynomials in n variables , one obtains the quadratic extension , which is the ring of alternating polynomials.

Vandermonde polynomial of a polynomial 
Given a polynomial, the Vandermonde polynomial of its roots is defined over the splitting field; for a non-monic polynomial, with leading coefficient a, one may define the Vandermonde polynomial as

(multiplying with a leading term) to accord with the discriminant.

Generalizations
Over arbitrary rings, one instead uses a different polynomial to generate the alternating polynomials – see (Romagny, 2005).

Weyl character formula
 (a vast generalization)

The Vandermonde polynomial can be considered a special case of the Weyl character formula, specifically the Weyl denominator formula (the case of the trivial representation) of the special unitary group .

See also
 Capelli polynomial (ref)

References
 The fundamental theorem of alternating functions, by Matthieu Romagny, September 15, 2005

Polynomials
Symmetric functions